John Maurice Tucker (January 7, 1916, Yamhill County, Oregon – July 5, 2008) was an American botanist, herbarium director, and leading expert on oak taxonomy.

At the University of California, Berkeley (UC Berkeley), he graduated in botany in 1940 with a bachelor's degree and in 1950 with a Ph.D. As a graduate student he was the botanist on the University of California's El Salvador Expedition, which lasted from December 1941 to May 1942.
His Ph.D dissertation, entitled "Interrelationships within the Quercus dumosa complex", was written under the guidance of Herbert L. Mason, Ledyard Stebbins, and Adriance Foster. The dissertation "dealt with the evolution and relationships of scrub oak (Quercus dumosa) and related species, including hybridization between scrub oak and grey oak (Quercus turbinella), and the parentage of Alvord’s oak (Quercus × alvordiana).

In 1947, while still a graduate student at UC Berkeley, he was hired as the director of the herbarium of the botany department of the University of California, Davis (UC Davis). From 1947 until his retirement in 1986, he was the director of the botany department's herbarium and a faculty member in the botany department. He taught the UC Davis course on plant taxonomy, as well as courses on general botany and poisonous plants. He also served as the director of the UC Davis Arboretum for 12 years.

In 1947, when Tucker became the director, the UC Davis herbarium consisted of 9,400 specimens. He initiated an active exchange program which, by the time he retired, increased the UC Davis Botany Department Herbarium's holdings to about 150,000 specimens.

He was a Guggenheim Fellow for the academic year 1955–1956, which he spent on sabbatical leave studying variation in hybrid oak populations in the region of the southern Rocky Mountains.

In 1963 he was elected a Fellow of the American Association for the Advancement of Science.

In 2001 Tucker made a philanthropic gift of $500,000 to the herbarium and arboretum at UC Davis. He was a mentor and advisor for not only botany students, but also some entomology students.

In 1942 in California, he married Katrine June Petersen (1918–1987). They had two sons and a daughter. Upon his death in 2008, John Maurice Tucker was survived by a daughter, a son, and a grandson. Another son, John Christopher "Chris" Tucker (born 1948), died in 2003.

Eponyms
 Quercus john-tuckeri Nixon & C.H.Mull.

Selected publications

References

1916 births
2008 deaths
20th-century American botanists
21st-century American botanists
University of California, Berkeley alumni
University of California, Davis faculty
Fellows of the American Association for the Advancement of Science